Air Command for Military Transportation (English for Comando Aéreo de Transporte Militar, CATAM) is major military airfield for the use of the Colombian Air Force. Is located in the outskirts of Bogotá within the vicinity of El Dorado International Airport.

CATAM military airport 

On 3 September 1932, the Military Transport Service was launched in Colombia, when a Junkers F-13 carried for the first time, to the south of country, Colonel Luis Acevedo and his party. Acevedo served as general director of aviation in the country. Although the military air transport infrastructure had not been formed yet, that mission was accomplished during the conflict with Peru in a rudimentary but effective way, with aircraft like the Junkers W-34, Ju-52 and BT-32 Condor.

Twelve years later, with Decree No. 2321, consolidated service "Transport Squadron 101", Air Base in Madrid, Cundinamarca, operationally dependent on the Air Force Command. The Squadron was equipped with W-34, Ju-52, BT-32, C-60 and C-47 Sky Train, but got its real boom as the cradle of military transport during the events of 9 April 1948, where it established an air bridge to transport troops from different parts of the country to the capital.

In 1954 it created a "Liaison Squadron" operating on the direct orders of the President of the Republic, at the time, Gen. Gustavo Rojas Pinilla Airport and located in the Roof. The success led to create the Military Airlift Group, which reached Category Transport Base in 1959. By then, finished the construction of the El Dorado International Airport, so that the command of the Colombian Air Force ordered the transfer of the unit to the site, using the airport facilities, while finishing the construction of the base, which ended on 28 May 1963.

For FAC Directive No. 4429 of 8 July of that year, provided that the base unit to acquire the status of Operations and Logistics Support, starting operations on 25 October of that year.

In 1968 the first two Hercules C-130, FAC-1001 and 1002. These aircraft, clearly designed for missions and troop transport war materials led the landing on short runways and unpaved requirements at the time approaching to the needs of the Colombian Air Force.

In 1964, by Decree No. 798, was consolidated Reconnaissance Squadron, to have a fleet of aircraft RT-33, RB-26 and RC-45, which were out of service regularly.

In 1977, the Military Transport Aviation Command was named after the Colombian aviation pioneer, Brigadier General Honorary Camilo Daza Alvarez.

In 1983, he reached the air base Stratolifter C-135 Boeing B-707 model commercial version, which increased air transport capacity of the Unit. In 1990 was amended so that it could serve as tanker aircraft and thus fueling the aircraft flying combat
M-5, C-7 and A-37.

In order to expand capacity troop transport and cargo in support of surface forces in their fight against subversion and drug trafficking, the Air Force acquired new C-130 Hercules aircraft that have supported, not only missions public policy, but also humanitarian assistance, like the earthquake in Popayan, blocking the road to Llano in October 1991, separating the area from around the country and the earthquake in Armenia, where he carried about 1338 people affected and were delivered 411 tons of humanitarian aid donated by national and international governmental organizations.

Between 1990 and 1991, the CATAM received from the U.S. government, six C-130B aircraft to support operations to combat drug traffickers and guerrillas, allowing rapid mobilization into the tactical theaters of operation and increase the chances of success, flying in the year a total of 6054:00 hours in total, and carry about 91,060 passengers and 8.1012 million kilos of cargo.

In late 1996, came the unfortunate episode of the shipment of drugs in one of the Air Force planes, an incident that tarnished the corporate image, but which allowed the introduction of new security measures and control within the unit to avoid repetition of similar events.

In 1996 began to take shape breakthroughs in the area of infrastructure Military Transport Aviation Command, the narrow street that impeded the entrance and exit of vehicles destined for the office, was replaced by a dual carriageway and a tunnel that allows access vehicular traffic below the access ramp to the track N ° 2 El Dorado International Airport. Furthermore, increased parking capacity of the Unit, from 120 vehicles to 260 or so.

The enlargement of the unit also meant improving the security of the same; perimeter fence was installed around CATAM. It had been surrounded by barbed wire. Power plant was acquired to support the unit and underground ducts were equipped with fiber optic cables and energy for the later installation of security cameras that expanded the base and alternative energy supply in case of failure of main supply.

The barracks were expanded by building new housing for officers and NCOs unmarried tax as apartments and houses for military families married, and modernized the facilities of the soldiers. Also, facilities were upgraded Aerospace Museum, unique in Latin America, as aircraft are kept there as the Junkers 52, AT-6 Texan, C-60 Lodestar, Kansan AT-11, Thunderbolt P-47, Mentor T-34, Silver T-33, Skymaster C-54, Invader B-26, Shooting Star F-28, Sabre F-86, Mescalero T-41, Tweet T-37, OV-10 Bronco, Kaydet PT-17, C-47 Skytrain, A-37 Dragon Fly, Merlin C-26 and Hercules C-130 and helicopters such as Eaver L-20 (U6-A), Raven OH-12, UH-1B Iraquois.

The museum has to inform the public part of the institutional history, see planes that have been in service over the 85-year history of the Colombian Air Force and establish a closer bond between the community and the Air Force.

International The ramp is part of the buildings that were made to improve the unit, and was made of concrete slabs up to 50 or 60 inches thick, to support the weight of aircraft that transits later. In addition, optimum illumination was achieved by installing light poles with greater capacity.
In July 1999, with the collaboration of Civil Aviation, opened the new office CATAM and their respective platform, which is the new lounge a Presidential.

This was the most significant modernization of the last years of the Military Transport Aviation Command, allowing the improvement of operations, to have a broader platform and an office more modern and better features.

In February 2003, the base is responsible for operational missions of aeromedical transport, thanks to the suitability of an aircraft CN-235 Nurtanio Hunting with stretchers, allowing the evacuation of a large number of patients.

With the advent of night vision air operations since 2003, the Military Transport Aviation Command acquired the ability to operate on computers NVG Hercules C-130 and CN-235 Nurtanio, in order to increase the operational and support capacity the surface forces by the fulfillment of transport missions, parachuting and aeromedical evacuation on dirt landing strips without lighting.

In this way the Air Force increased its operating capacity by 100% since props are made of all kinds 24 hours a day.

External links
 CATAM homepage (Spanish)

Colombian Air Force bases
Airports in Colombia
Air force transport units and formations